Pandaveswar Airfield is a former wartime United States Army Air Forces airfield in India used during the Burma Campaign 1944-1945.  It is now abandoned.

History
Pandaveswar was a major Tenth Air Force combat airfield, hosting numerous groups between 1942 and 1945.  Known units assigned were:
 7th Bombardment Group, 12 December 1942 – 17 January 1944 B-24 Liberator
 12th Bombardment Group, 13 June-16 July 1944 B-25 Mitchell
 4th Combat Cargo Group, November 1945-15 January 1946 C-46 Commando
 8th Photographic Reconnaissance Group, 3 January-29 October 1943
 427th Night Fighter Squadron, 31 October -23 December 1944 P-61 Black Widow

After the combat cargo unit moved out in January 1946, it appears the airfield was closed.    Today, the remains of both main runways (16/34, 04/22) are visible in aerial photography, along with numerous dispersal pads in vegetative areas along with several taxiways.   The majority of the support station has been dismantled, however some derelict buildings and streets can still be seen, along with a village that appears to have been built on the site.

References

 Maurer, Maurer. Air Force Combat Units Of World War II. Maxwell Air Force Base, Alabama: Office of Air Force History, 1983. 
  www.pacificwrecks.com - Pandaveswar keyword search

External links
Google satellite view of Pandaveswar Airfield

Airfields of the United States Army Air Forces in British India
Defunct airports in India
Airports in West Bengal
Buildings and structures in Paschim Bardhaman district
Airports established in 1942
1942 establishments in India
20th-century architecture in India